New Zealand competed at the 2022 World Aquatics Championships in Budapest, Hungary from 18 June to 3 July.

Artistic swimming 

New Zealand entered 10 artistic swimmers.

Women

Diving

New Zealand entered 7 divers.

Men

Women

Mixed

Open water swimming

New Zealand entered 1 open water female swimmers 

Women

Swimming

New Zealand entered 12 swimmers.
Men

Women

Mixed

Water polo

Summary

Women's tournament

Team roster

Group play

Playoffs

9–12th place semifinals

Ninth place game

References

Nations at the 2022 World Aquatics Championships
2022
World Aquatics Championships